Telfer is a surname, principally of Scottish origin, with the name deriving from  (see: Taillefer), the Old French nickname for a strong man or ferocious warrior (taille(r) meaning 'to cut'). It is sometimes linked with the surname Telford, although the two names have distinct and unrelated origins.

It is the surname of:
Alexander Telfer-Smollett (1884–1954), British army officer and politician
Bob Telfer, Scottish-Australian soccer player, referee, coach and administrator
Cece Telfer, American transgender athlete
Charlie Telfer (born 1995), Scottish footballer
Chris Telfer, American politician and accountant
Colin Telfer (born 1947), Scottish rugby union player
David Telfer (born 1988), Ghanaian footballer
Don Telfer (born 1961), Canadian rower
Evelyn Telfer, Scottish biologist and professor
Garry Telfer (1965–2007), Scottish footballer
George Telfer (born 1955), English footballer
Ian Telfer, Canadian mining executive
Jay Telfer (1947–2009), Canadian musician and songwriter
Jim Telfer (born 1940), Scottish rugby union player and coach
John Telfer (1873–1938), British auctioneer and philatelist
Margaret Alison Telfer (1904–1974), Australian university administrator
Matthew Telfer, (born 1994), cybersecurity expert and former cybercriminal
Michelle Telfer (born 1974), Australian former gymnast
Nancy Telfer (born 1950), Canadian choral conductor, composer and educator
Paul Telfer (actor) (born 1979), Scottish actor
Paul Telfer (footballer) (born 1971), Scottish footballer
Richard J. Telfer, American educator
Robert Sutherland Telfer, American actor
Ryan Telfer (born 1994), Trinidad and Tobago footballer
Wendy Frew (née Telfer, born 1984), New Zealand netball player
William Telfer, multiple people

References